Brynn Zalina Lovett (born 28 February 1993) is a Malaysian dancer and swimming instructor as well as former beauty queen. She was crowned as Miss Malaysia World 2015 by her predecessor, Dewi Liana Seriestha at the pageant's grand finals in Corus Hotel, Kuala Lumpur on 29 August 2015.

Early life 
Lovett's father is half Australian half Scottish while her mother is Murut. She has a twin sister named Tracey Lovett, who was a finalist at Miss Malaysia World 2014 which inspired her to participate the following year. She holds a Foundation in Communications from Taylor's University.

Career

Pageantry
Miss World Malaysia 2015
Aside from winning the eventual title, Lovett also won three subsidiary titles; Miss Talent, Miss Wacoal and Miss Fitness.

Miss World 2015
Lovett represented Malaysia at Miss World 2015 competition which was held in Sanya, China on 19 December 2015. Although she was unplaced, she finished as 1st runner-up for Miss World Talent, top 10 for the Multimedia Award & top 11 for the Dances of the World.

Acting career
Lovett played a small part in the 2018 musical, Ola Bola The Musical, which is based on the movie of the same name.

Charitable works 
Lovett started Dance for Hope, a charity competition that raises treatment funds for child cancer patients, in collaboration with the National Cancer Council Malaysia (MAKNA). The project was Lovett's Beauty With A Purpose project, and is a tribute to her father who died from cancer when she was fifteen.

References

External links 
 Brynn Zalina Lovett at Miss World Malaysia

1993 births
Living people
People from Sabah
Malaysian twins
Identical twins
Murut people
Malaysian people of Australian descent
Malaysian female dancers
Malaysian beauty pageant winners
Miss World 2015 delegates